Eligma malgassica is a moth in the family Nolidae.  This species was first described by Walter Rothschild in 1896 and is endemic to Madagascar.

Notes
The Afromoths database refers to the species as Eligma malagassica as does the Global Lepidoptera Names Index of the Natural History Museum, London.

References

Moths described in 1896
Eligminae